Basketball at the Lusophone Games was first held in the first edition in Macau, in 2006.

Men's tournament

Women's tournament

 
B
Sports at the Lusofonia Games
Lusophony Games